The Sparks Middle School shooting occurred in Sparks, Nevada, on October 21, 2013. Two people, including the perpetrator, were killed, and two others were injured. Sparks Middle School is part of the Washoe County School District.

Shooting

On October 21, 2013, Jose Reyes, a 12-year-old student in seventh grade, opened fire with a handgun at the basketball courts of Sparks Middle School. He injured a 12-year-old student, KJ Kersey, in the shoulder. Michael Landsberry, a 45-year-old math teacher who was trying to intervene with Reyes, was shot and killed in the playground. Reyes then shot and wounded a 12-year-old student, Mason Davis, who tried to come to Landsberry's assistance. Davis suffered an injury to his abdomen. Reyes then committed suicide by shooting himself in the head. The shooting happened before classes, and the school was evacuated and was closed for the week. Details of the shooting emerged in the report issued the following spring.

Perpetrator
Jose Horacio Reyes (July 2, 2001 – October 21, 2013), was born in Reno, Nevada, to parents from Mexico. He had two younger sisters, and grew up partially in Arizona where his father found a construction job, but later moved with his family back to Nevada. Reyes's parents owned a restaurant in Sparks. In early 2012, Reyes's father was charged with and pleaded guilty to misdemeanor child abuse for an incident involving his son. Reyes left two suicide notes claiming he was bullied , and had taken the antidepressant Prozac and an antipsychotic drug.

Aftermath
The incident has been a continuing subject of public concern and discussion. In November 2015, Hillary Clinton discussed the shooting at Sparks during her campaign for the presidency, as part of her campaign for gun control.

References

External links
School website
Hillary Clinton campaign speech about the Sparks school shooting

Deaths by firearm in Nevada
Murder in Nevada
Murder–suicides in Nevada
Murder committed by minors
School shootings committed by pupils
Middle school shootings in the United States
Sparks, Nevada
Crimes in Nevada
2013 in Nevada
2013 murders in the United States
Mass shootings in Nevada
Washoe County School District
Attacks in the United States in 2013
October 2013 crimes in the United States
Filmed murder–suicides